Zhengzhou Greenland Plaza, also named as Millennium Royal Plaza, is a skyscraper in Zhengzhou, Henan, China. Construction started in 2007 and was completed in 2012.

The building was the tallest skyscraper in Zhengzhou upon its completion in 2012. It was later surpassed by the twin towers of Zhengzhou Greenland Central Plaza when the twin towers were completed in November 2016.

Nickname
This building is often referred to as the "Big Corn" by natives, due to its corn-like shape and all yellow lighting at night.

See also
List of tallest buildings in China

References

Skyscrapers in Zhengzhou
Commercial buildings completed in 2012
2012 establishments in China
Skyscraper office buildings in China
Skyscraper hotels in China